Chungbuk National Law School is one of the professional graduate schools of Chungbuk National University, located in Cheongju, South Korea. Founded in 2009, it is one of the founding law schools in South Korea and is one of the medium-sized schools with each class in the three-year J.D. program having approximately 70 students.

Programs
Chungbuk Law specializes in Science and Technology law.

References

enternal links 
 

Law schools in South Korea
Educational institutions established in 2009
2009 establishments in South Korea
ko:충북대학교 법학전문대학원